Mərzəndiyə (also, Mirzəyandigah, Mirzəyəndigah, Marazandigyakh, Marzayandigyakh, and Merzengeli) is a village and municipality in the Shamakhi Rayon of Azerbaijan.  It has a population of 1,033.

References 

Populated places in Shamakhi District